Hans-Eberhard Junkersdorf (born 27 September 1938) is a German film producer. He has produced more than 50 films since 1975. He was a member of the jury at the 38th Berlin International Film Festival.

Selected filmography

 Room 13 (1964)
 Coup de Grâce (1976)
 Knife in the Head (1978)
 Germany in Autumn (1978)
 The Candidate (1980)
 Marianne and Juliane (1981)
 Sheer Madness (1983)
 Rosa Luxemburg (1986)
 The Voyager (1992)
 The Promise (1995)
 The Fearless Four (1997)
 Desire (2000)
 Angst (2003)

References

External links

1938 births
Living people
German animated film producers
German animated film directors
Film people from Berlin
Officers Crosses of the Order of Merit of the Federal Republic of Germany